On the dorsum of the foot the dorsal digital veins receive, in the clefts between the toes, the intercapitular veins from the plantar venous arch and join to form short common digital veins.

References 

Veins of the lower limb